Barking at Airplanes is the ninth studio album by American singer-songwriter Kim Carnes, released on May 5, 1985 by EMI America Records.

The album spawned two Billboard Hot 100 hit singles; "Crazy in the Night (Barking at Airplanes)" (No. 15) and "Abadabadango" (No. 67). The 2001 reissue includes the Horn/Downes-penned track "I Am a Camera", which was previously recorded by Yes on their 1980 Drama album (as "Into the Lens") and by Downes and Horn themselves on the final Buggles album, Adventures in Modern Recording (1981).

Writing and recording 
Barking at Airplanes is the first album Carnes co-produced since St. Vincent's Court (1979). The album is noted by Nashville Scene as the first synth-pop album produced by a woman. Carnes wrote "Don't Pick Up the Phone" and "Crazy in the Night" on a ARP String Ensemble. "Crazy in the Night" was inspired by her son Collin's fear of the dark. The track opens with three loud door knocks followed by Collin saying, "Who is it?". Carnes' writing was inspired by films including Metropolis and Black Orpheus, with a direct reference to the latter in the track "He Makes the Sun Rise (Orpheus)". "Bon Voyage" features a sample of tannoy announcements recorded at Charles de Gaulle Airport by a staff member at the French branch of EMI.

Release and promotion 
Barking at Airplanes was released on May 5, 1985 by EMI America. In 2001, the album was reissued by EMI-Capitol Special Markets with three bonus tracks; a cover of "Into the Lens" (retitled as "I Am a Camera") by Yes, "Forever" written by Steven Van Zandt, and a demo version of Carnes singing "Make No Mistake, He's Mine". Carnes became aware of this reissue during an interview with Nashville Scene in 2020, and said she never intended for them to be released.

"Crazy in the Night (Barking at Airplanes)" was released as the album's lead single on April 1, 1985. It spent a total of sixteen weeks on the Billboard Hot 100 chart, peaking at no. 15. The song also reached no. 24 on the Dance Club Songs chart and no. 22 on the Cash Box Top 100 Singles chart. The single charted highest in South Africa where it peaked at no. 3. The track received two remixes by Rusty Garner. "Abadabadango" was released as the album's second single in July 1985. It spent four weeks on the Billboard Hot 100 peaking at no. 67. The track received two extended remixes by Rusty Garner and Jack Witherby. "Rough Edges" was released in the US and Canada as the album's third single in October 1985. In the same year, "Bon Voyage" was released as a single exclusively in the Netherlands.

Critical reception

In a retrospective review for AllMusic, Stephen Thomas Erlewine described Barking at Airplanes as a "cohesive and consistent album" and her best outing since Mistaken Identity.

People stated that Carnes has "never recorded an album as pleasing as this", noting her "enchanting" voice.

Track listing

Personnel 
 Kim Carnes – lead vocals, backing vocals (1-5, 7-10)
 Bill Cuomo – synthesizers (1, 3, 4, 9), drum programming (1, 2, 6), Kurzweil synthesizer (5, 10), Yamaha DX7 (5, 10), keyboards (6, 7), additional synthesizer (8), Roland JX-3P (10)
 Duane Hitchings – synthesizers (8), Oberheim DMX programming (8)
 Waddy Wachtel – electric guitar (1), backing vocals (1, 6), guitars (2, 6, 8)
 Lindsey Buckingham – guitars (3), lead and backing vocals (3)
 Craig Hull – guitars (3, 9)
 Chas Sanford – guitars (4)
 Ry Cooder – guitars (7)
 Erik Scott – bass (3, 6, 7, 9)
 David Jackson – bass (4)
 Leland Sklar – bass (5, 10)
 Craig Krampf – drum programming (1, 2, 6), backing vocals (1, 6), drums (3, 9, 10), Oberheim DMX (3, 9)
 Gary Mallaber – drums (4)
 Paulinho da Costa – percussion (2, 4, 5, 9)
 Jerry Peterson – saxophone (3, 4, 8, 9)
 Dave Ellingson – backing vocals (1-4, 6, 7, 8, 10)
 Daniel Moore – backing vocals (1, 4, 6, 7, 8), lead vocals (8)
 Julia Tillman Waters – backing vocals (4, 7-10)
 Maxine Waters Willard – backing vocals (4, 7-10)
 Niko Bolas – backing vocals (6)
 Martha Davis – backing vocals (7)
 James Ingram – backing vocals (7)

Production 
 Kim Carnes – producer 
 Bill Cuomo – producer (1-7, 9, 10)
 Duane Hitchings – producer (8)
 Mark Ettel – recording engineer 
 Sabrina Bucharek – second engineer
 Tony Chiappa – second engineer
 Judy Clapp – second engineer
 Denny Densmore – second engineer
 David Egerton – second engineer
 Steve MacMillan – second engineer
 Niko Bolas – additional engineer 
 Richard Bosworth – additional engineer 
 Duane Seykora – additional engineer 
 Mike Shipley – mixing (1-5, 8, 9, 10)
 Ian Taylor – mixing (6, 7)
 George Marino – mastering 
 Sue McGonigle – project coordinator 
 Henry Marquez – art direction 
 Jay Vigon – design 
 Richard Seireeni – design
 Eric Blum – back cover photo
 Greg Corman – front cover photo 
 Matthew Rolston – inner sleeve photos
 Michael Brokaw – direction

Studios
 Recorded at Ocean Way Recording and Record One (Los Angeles, California).
 Mixed at Larrabee Sound Studios and Galaxy Studios (Hollywood, California).
 Mastered at Sterling Sound (New York City, New York).

Charts

Release history

References

External links
 

1985 albums
Kim Carnes albums
EMI Records albums